Britt Schultz (born 30 January 1945) is a Norwegian politician for the Labour Party.

She served as a deputy representative to the Norwegian Parliament from Finnmark during the term 1977–1981.

During the cabinet Jagland, Schultz was appointed State Secretary in the Office of the Prime Minister. She was again appointed State Secretary during the first cabinet Stoltenberg, this time in the Ministry of Trade and Industry.

References

1945 births
Living people
Deputy members of the Storting
Finnmark politicians
Labour Party (Norway) politicians
Norwegian state secretaries
Women members of the Storting
Norwegian women state secretaries